The Brooke class was a United States Navy frigate class based on the design of the , but with the addition of the Tartar Guided Missile System. The first unit was commissioned in 1966 and the final sixth unit was decommissioned in 1989.



Description
Brooke-class ships were nearly identical to the Garcia class, except the second 5-inch/38 caliber gun was replaced with a Tartar missile system and electronics. Brooke class ships also had the AN/SPS-52 3D air search radar instead of the two dimension AN/SPS-40 and added the AN/SPG-51 for target tracking and missile guidance. The Mk 22 single arm missile launcher was placed amidships. The magazine held 16 missiles.

FFG-1 through FFG-3 had a Westinghouse geared steam turbine while FFG-4 through FFG-6 employed a General Electric turbine. All ships had two Foster Wheeler boilers. FFG-4 through FFG-6 had an angled base of the bridge structure behind the ASROC launcher for automatic reloading.

The Brooke class was originally designed to carry the DASH drone, but were later equipped with LAMPS SH-2 Seasprite after the hangar was enlarged.

 systems were evaluated on  including the Otobreda 76 mm gun, the AN/SQS-56 sonar and other systems.

Initially authorized as guided missile destroyer escorts (DEG), FFG-1 through FFG-3 were authorized in FY1962 while FFG-4 through FFG-6 were authorized in FY1963. Plans called for ten more ships to be authorized in FY1964 and possibly three more in later years, but those plans were dropped because of the $11 million higher cost of the DEG over an FF.

Units

Gallery

Notes

External links

Brooke-class guided missile frigates at Destroyer

 

 Brooke class frigates
 Brooke
 Brooke